Strategius was a 7th-century monk of Mar Saba. He wrote a sermon on the siege and sack of Jerusalem in 614 and its aftermath, the forcible relocation of some of its inhabitants to Ctesiphon and the efforts of the Patriarch Zacharias to stiffen their faith in the face of persecution. Despite some deficiencies, this "account is of great value to the historian, as long as it is handled judiciously."

Although originally written in Greek, the Greek text is lost. The sermon survives in Georgian and Arabic translations. The Georgian text is found in three manuscripts. The earliest dates to around 1040 and was copied at the Monastery of the Cross in Jerusalem. In a later 13th-century copy, it covers sixty-six octavo pages. The full Arabic translation is found in three manuscripts and an abridged version in two more. Both the Georgian and Arabic versions have been published along with translations into Latin. Nikolai Marr translated the Georgian text into Russian. He argued that the Georgian translation was made from an Arabic version in the 10th century. There is also a partial English translation from Georgian.

Strategius, sometimes called Antiochos Strategos, has been tentatively identified with the monk Antiochus of Palestine, but this is unproven.

Notes

Bibliography

7th-century Byzantine monks
7th-century Greek writers
Sermon writers